Richard Dennis Oatts (born April 2, 1953) is an American jazz saxophonist, multi-instrumentalist, composer, and educator.

Biography
While growing up in Des Moines, Iowa, Oatts gained an interest in music from his father, Jack Oatts, who was a saxophonist himself and a respected music educator in the Midwest. After high school, Oatts attended Drake University for one year before dropping out and moving to Minneapolis to begin a career in music in 1972. In 1977, he was called by Thad Jones to join The Thad Jones/Mel Lewis Orchestra, which later became the Vanguard Jazz Orchestra. Oatts moved to New York City to join the band, first playing tenor saxophone, and began playing Monday nights with Jones and Lewis at the Village Vanguard, as well as touring in Europe with them. Eventually Oatts switched to playing alto saxophone in the band, and he continues to play with the Vanguard Jazz Orchestra at the Village Vanguard every Monday night.

Oatts' work on woodwind instruments (saxophone, clarinet, flute) became more widely known when he led the crossover jazz group  Flim & the BB's in the 1980s and '90s with bassist Jimmy "Flim" Johnson, drummer Bill Berg, and keyboardist Billy Barber.

Since the 1970s, Oatts has released more than a dozen albums as a leader and co-leader, and he has appeared on over 100 albums as a sideman with Joe Henderson, Jerry Bergonzi, Eddie Gómez, Bob Brookmeyer, the Vanguard Jazz Orchestra, Joe Lovano and others, working extensively with Steeplechase Records. He has also accompanied Joe Williams, Sarah Vaughan, Mel Tormé, and Ella Fitzgerald.

Oatts has taught at the  Manhattan School of Music and has been artist-in-residence at the Amsterdam Conservatory. In 2006, he became a professor and artistic director of the jazz studies department at Temple University in Philadelphia.

Discography

As a leader or co-leader
1990: Dial and Oatts (DMP) with Garry Dial
1990: Brassworks (DMP) with Garry Dial
1997: All of Three (Steeplechase)
1999: Standard Issue Vol. 1 (Steeplechase)
2000: Simone's Dance (Steeplechase)
2000: Standard Issue Vol. 2 (Steeplechase)
2000: Meru (Steeplechase) with the Dave Santoro Quartet
2001: South Paw (Steeplechase)
2006: Jam Session, Vol. 18 (Steeplechase) with Billy Drewes & Walt Weiskopf
2008: Gratitude (Steeplechase)
2009: Saxology (Steeplechase) with Jerry Bergonzi
2010: Two Hearts (Steeplechase)
2010: The Clouds Above (Audial) with Soren Moller
2011: Bridging the Gap (Planet Arts) with Terell Stafford
2011: Black Nile (Radiosnj) with Cameron Brown, Lorenzo Lombardo, & Gary Versace
2012: Lookin' Up (Steeplechase)
2014: Sweet Nowhere (Steeplechase) with Harold Danko
2018: Use Your Imagination (Steeplechase)

As a sideman
With Thad Jones/Mel Lewis
 1978: It Only Happens Every Time  
 1978: One More Time  
 1979: Naturally 
 1980: Bob Brookmeyer – Composer & Arranger 
 1981: Mellifluous (Gatemouth) - Mel Lewis Quintet 
 1981: Live in Montreux 
 1982: Make Me Smile & Other New Works by Bob Brookmeyer 
 1985: 20 Years at the Village Vanguard 
 1988: Live at the Village Vanguard 
 1988: Definitive Thad Jones, Vol. 2: Live from the Village Vanguard 
 1988: Soft Lights and Hot Music 
 1989: Lost Art  
 1991: To You: A Tribute to Mel Lewis 
 1993: Body and Soul  
 2008: Definitive Thad Jones: Live from the Village Vanguard

With Vanguard Jazz Orchestra
 1997: Lickety Split: The Music of Jim McNeely
 1999: Thad Jones Legacy
 2002: Can I Persuade You
 2004: The Way: Music of Slide Hampton
 2007: Up From the Skies: Music of Jim McNeely
 2008: Monday Night Live at the Village Vanguard
 2011: Forever Lasting: Live in Tokyo

With Flim & the BBs
 1978: Flim & the BBs
 1982: Tricycle
 1984: Tunnel
 1985: Big Notes
 1987: Neon
 1988: The Further Adventures of Flim & the BBs
 1990: New Pants 
 1991: Vintage BBs
 1992: This is a Recording

With Red Rodney
 1986: No Turn On Red
 1988: Red Snapper

With Ray Mantilla
 1984: Hands of Fire
 1988: Dark Powers
 1986: Synergy

With Colors of Jazz
 1991: From Hollywood 
 1991: For Tropical Nights 
 1991: For Sunday Morning
 1991: From Dusk Till Dawn

With Everything but the Girl
 1991: Worldwide
 1992: Acoustic
 2013: The Language of Life

With Armen Donelian
 1988: Secrets
 1990: Wayfarer

With Susannah McCorkle
 1993: From Bessie to Brazil 
 1994: From Broadway to Bebop 
 1999: From Broken Hearts to Blue Skies 
 2000: Hearts and Minds

With Joe Lovano
 1995: Rush Hour
 1996: Celebrating Sinatra
 2002: Viva Caruso

With Nnenna Freelon
 1998: Maiden Voyage
 1994: Listen

With Ted Rosenthal
 1992: Images of Monk
 2003: Expressions

With Eddie Gómez
 1988: Power Play
 2008: Street Smart

With Gary Smulyan
 1993: Saxophone Mosaic
 2009: High Noon: The Jazz Soul of Frankie Laine

With others
 1981: Through a Looking Glass – Bob Brookmeyer
 1983: Impressions of Charles Mingus – Teo Macero
 1987: Initial Thrill – Kenia
 1989: Kaleidoscope – Bill Mays
 1989: Code Red – Code Red
 1989: Wilderness – Bob Thompson
 1991: So Intense – Lisa Fischer
 1991: The Road Not Taken – Stefan Karlsson
 1991: Ricky Peterson – Smile Blue
 1992: Still in Love With You – Meli'sa Morgan
 1992: Awakening – Bud Shank
 1992: The Moment – Yoshio Suzuki
 1992: Uh–Oh – David Byrne
 1992: Play–cation – Allen Farnham
 1992: Dial & Oatts Play Cole Porter – Garry Dial
 1993: View From Manhattan – Hendrik Meurkens
 1994: Heatin' System – Jack McDuff
 1994: Bite of the Apple – Peter Delano
 1995: This is Christmas – Luther Vandross
 1995: Manhattan Moods – Mary Stallings
 1995: Annette Lowman – Annette Lowman
 1995: I Was Born In Love With You – Denise Jannah
 1996: Portraits of Cuba – Paquito D'Rivera
 1996: Big Band – Joe Henderson
 1997: Ruben Gomez – Rubén Gómez
 1997: This Is Living! – Tom Talbert Orchestra
 1998: Tropic Heat – Dave Valentin
 1999: Souvenir – Ricky Peterson
 2001: Group Therapy – Jim McNeely
 2002: Leaving Home – David Berkman
 2002: Pasajes – Jim Brock
 2003: New Beginnings – Terell Stafford
 2004: Start Here... Finish There – David Berkman
 2004: Mean What You Say – Temple University Jazz Band
 2005: Echoes in the Night – Earl MacDonald
 2006: Oatts & Perry – Harold Danko
 2004: Let Yourself Go – Judi Silvano
 2006: Many Places – Gary Versace
 2007: Truth Is – Steve Million
 2007: Taking a Chance on Love – Simone Kopmaje
 2008: Runnin' in the Meadow – Michael Deacon
 2009: Walking on Air – Linda Baker
 2010: Oatts and Perry, Vol. 2 – Harold Danko
 2010: Homage – Stockholm Jazz Orchestra
 2010: Canopus – JazzNord Ensemble
 2011: At This Time – Norman David
 2011: Don't Look Back – Jane Stuart
 2011: Jazzing Vol. 3 – Sant Andreu Jazz Band
 2011: Legacy – Gerald Wilson Orchestra
 2014: We See Stars – Jim Olsen Ensemble
 2014: Intersecting Lines – Jerry Bergonzi
 2015: Jazzing Vol. 5 – Sant Andreu Jazz Band
2017: Life Changes -- Brian Eisenberg Jazz Orchestra

References

External links
Official website

Living people
1953 births
American jazz saxophonists
American male saxophonists
Musicians from Des Moines, Iowa
People from Jefferson, Iowa
21st-century American saxophonists
21st-century American male musicians
American male jazz musicians
Flim & the BB's members